Nikola Knežević (born 10 March 2003) is a Serbian football attacking midfielder who plays for Napredak Kruševac on loan from Red Star Belgrade.

References

External links
 

2003 births
Living people
Association football midfielders
Serbian footballers
Serbian First League players
RFK Grafičar Beograd players
People from Zemun
Serbia youth international footballers
Serbia under-21 international footballers